Wolfe Creek Crater National Park is a national park in Western Australia,  northeast of Perth. It contains Wolfe Creek Crater.

The park lies about  South from Halls Creek and can be accessed via the Tanami Road. The park is located on the edge of the Great Sandy Desert and is composed mostly of desert plains and spinifex grassland.

See also
 Protected areas of Western Australia

References

External links
WA National Parks: Wolfe Crater Creek (Naturebase)

National parks of Western Australia
Kimberley (Western Australia)
Protected areas established in 1969
Great Sandy Desert